Marco Boato (born 27 July 1944 in Venice) is an Italian politician.

Biography
In 1969 Boato was one of the founders, together with Adriano Sofri, Paolo Sorbi, Mauro Rostagno, Guido Viale, Paolo Brogi and Giorgio Pietrostefani, of the communist political movement Lotta Continua.

A progressive Christian, in 1973 he was among the promoters of the Christians for Socialism movement. Subsequently, he joined Proletarian Democracy and the Radical Party. He has served as Deputy and Senator several times between 1979 and 2008.

He holds the record for the longest speech held in the history of the Italian Chamber of Deputies, for the speech he delivered in 1981 lasting over 18 hours and 5 minutes against the extension of one year of police detention established by a decree law of Francesco Cossiga.

References

1944 births
Living people
Politicians from Venice
20th-century Italian politicians
21st-century Italian politicians
Federation of the Greens politicians
Rainbow Greens politicians
Radical Party (Italy) politicians
Proletarian Democracy politicians
Green Europe politicians